The London Tornado of 1091  is the earliest reported tornado in England, occurring in London on Friday, 17 October 1091. It has been reckoned by modern assessment as possibly a T8 on the TORRO scale (roughly equivalent to an F4 on the Fujita scale) making it potentially the strongest recorded tornado in the British Isles, although this estimate is based on reports written 30 years after the tornado. Other churches in the area were demolished, as were over 600 (mostly wooden) houses. For all the damage inflicted, the tornado claimed just two known victims from a population of about 18,000. The tornado is mentioned in chronicles by Florence of Worcester and William of Malmesbury, the latter describing it as "a great spectacle for those watching from afar, but a terrifying experience for those standing near".

See also
 Tornado records
 2006 London tornado

References

1091 in England
11th century in London
11th-century natural disasters
Disasters in London
Medieval weather events
Tornadoes in the United Kingdom
Weather events in England
William II of England
Tornadoes of 1091